These are the Billboard magazine number-one albums of 1976, per the Billboard 200.

Chart history

See also
1976 in music
List of number-one albums (United States)

References

1976
1976 record charts